Anne-Mette Christensen  (born 4 March 1973) is a Danish women's international footballer who plays as a defender. She was a member of the Denmark women's national football team, making three appearances for the team in 1999. She was part of the team at the 1999 FIFA Women's World Cup. In club football, she played for Fortuna Hjørring.

References

1973 births
Living people
Danish women's footballers
Denmark women's international footballers
Place of birth missing (living people)
1999 FIFA Women's World Cup players
Women's association football defenders
Fortuna Hjørring players